International Military-Technical Forum "Army" is an event organized by the Ministry of Defense of the Russian Federation. It includes special projects, such as International Exhibition of High-Performance Equipment and Technologies for the Rearmament of Defense Enterprises "Intelligent Industrial Technologies" and the specialized exhibition "Innovation Club".

Photo sets

2020 
 35 states participated in the Army-2020 forum.
 Almost 1,500 defence industry organisations took part in the forum, presenting over 28,000 exhibits.
 Rostec presented over 1100 inventions in 2020
 Experts from Mil.Press prepared a film about must-sees of the Army-2020. This included army, naval and air force equipment, solutions for security, digitalization, diversification, and the preview of the Army-2021 exhibition.
 Ruselectronics Group Sozvezdiye unveiled the fifth-generation of the R-176-1AE radio station, which serves as a component of mobile long-range communications radio center used by the Russian Armed Forces.

2021 

 In 2021 the forum was held from the 22nd to the 28th of August.
 The Russian Ministry of Defence (MO) signed 41 contracts worth RUB500 billion (US$8.3 billion) with 27 defence enterprises during Army 2021 for the delivery of 1,300 new weapon systems and the refurbishment of 150 existing systems, while Rostec's Rosoboronexport arms exporter signed deals worth EUR2 billion (US$2.04 billion) with China on seaborne hardware, with India on land forces’ equipment and also with Armenia, Uzbekistan, Myanmar and Belarus.
 The military Technopolis "Era" presented a working model of electric transport developed for the Armed Forces of the Russian Federation - the "ERA" electric vehicle.
 Nearly 100 countries participated in the Seventh Army-2021 International Military Technology Forum.

References

External links

 Official site

Arms fairs